İsmail Temiz (born 8 January 1954) is a Turkish former wrestler who competed in the 1976 Summer Olympics and in the 1984 Summer Olympics.

References

External links
 

1954 births
Living people
Olympic wrestlers of Turkey
Wrestlers at the 1976 Summer Olympics
Wrestlers at the 1984 Summer Olympics
Turkish male sport wrestlers
World Wrestling Championships medalists